Lude may refer to:

Lude, name of a Chinese YouTube influencer
Lude (stream), a stream in the Harz Mountains of Germany used by the historic mining industry
Alternative spelling for Ludic language
Short for Quaalude, brand name for Methaqualone
Mike Lude, American athlete, coach and administrator
Short for Honda Prelude